A memorial is an object or place which serves as a focus for the memory or the commemoration of something, usually an influential, deceased person or a historical, tragic event. Popular forms of memorials include landmark objects such as homes or other sites, or works of art such as sculptures, statues, fountains or parks. Larger memorials may be known as monuments.

Types
The most common type of memorial is the gravestone or the memorial plaque. Also common are war memorials commemorating those who have died in wars. Memorials in the form of a cross are called intending crosses.

Online memorials are often created on websites and social media to allow digital access as an alternative to physical memorials which may not be feasible or easily accessible.

When somebody has died, the family may request that a memorial gift (usually money) be given to a designated charity, or that a tree be planted in memory of the person. Those temporary or makeshift memorials are also called grassroots memorials.

Sometimes, when a student has died, the memorials are placed in the form of a scholarship, to be awarded to high-achieving students in future years.

Memorials to persons or events of major significance may be designated as national memorials.

See also 
Lists of monuments and memorials
Ghost bike
Historical marker
Memorial bench
Memorialization
National monument
Public history
Roadside memorial
Tomb of the Unknown Soldier
War memorial
Culture of Remembrance

References

External links

Commemorative Landscapes of North Carolina